Peter Pan (1904–1933) was an American Thoroughbred racehorse and sire, bred and raced by prominent horseman, James R. Keene. As winner of the Belmont Stakes, the Brooklyn Derby and the Brighton Handicap, he was later inducted into the National Museum of Racing and Hall of Fame. His progeny included many famous American racehorses, including several winners of the Kentucky Derby and the Preakness Stakes.

Background

Bred and raced by prominent horseman, James R. Keene, Peter Pan was out of the mare Cinderella whose sire was Hermit, the 1867 winner of England's most important race, The Derby. Peter Pan was sired by Commando, a 1901 American Classic Race winner who in turn was a son of Domino, the American Horse of the Year of 1893.

Peter Pan was conditioned by future Hall of Fame trainer James G. Rowe, Sr.

Racing career
At age 2, Peter Pan won four of his eight starts including the prestigious 1906 Hopeful Stakes.

In 1907, Peter Pan won six of his nine starts with two seconds, one of which was in the spring in the Withers Stakes. As the prestigious U.S. Triple Crown of Thoroughbred Racing had not at that time been established, the 3-year-old Peter Pan was not entered in the Kentucky Derby or the Preakness Stakes. However, he won the then 1⅜ miles Belmont Stakes, a race that is now the third leg of the Triple Crown series. In winning the Belmont, he defeated Frank Gill who had beaten him in the Withers Stakes. In 1907, Peter Pan also won the important Brooklyn Derby, the Standard Stakes at Gravesend Race Track, as well as the Advance and the Tidal Stakes at Sheepshead Bay Race Track. Shortly after winning the Brighton Handicap he suffered a tendon injury and was retired to stallion duty at his owner's Castelton Stud. In a review of Peter Pan's win in the 1907 Brighton Handicap in front of 40,000 fans, the New York Telegraph was quoted as saying the horse "accomplished a task that completely overshadowed any previous 3-year-old performance in turf history."

Honors
Following its creation, Peter Pan was inducted in the National Museum of Racing and Hall of Fame in 1956, as were his sire Commando and grandsire Domino, as well as his granddaughter Top Flight.

Stud record
Peter Pan stood at his owner's Castleton Stud in Lexington, Kentucky then was sold for US$100,000 in 1912 to a breeding farm in France. Brought back to the United States, he was sold to Harry Payne Whitney and stood at Brookdale Farm in Lincroft, New Jersey until 1915 when he became the foundation sire for the new Whitney Farm in Lexington, Kentucky.

Peter Pan died in December 1933 at the age of twenty-nine and was buried at the Whitney Farm in Lexington (now part of the Gainesway Farm).

Progeny
Peter Pan's progeny includes:
 Black Toney (1911) - Foundation sire for Idle Hour Stock Farm, among the U.S. top twenty sires on ten occasions
 Pennant - sire of Hall of Fame inductees Equipoise & Jolly Roger  / 1924 U.S. Co-Champion Two Year Old Filly Maud Muller /  1938 Preakness Stakes winner Dauber
 Puss In Boots (1913) - 1915 U.S. Champion Two Year Old Filly
 Vexatious (1916) - 1919 Champion Three Year Old Filly
 Prudery (1918) - 1920 U.S. Champion Two Year Old Filly & 1921 Champion Three Year Old Filly
 Tryster (1918) - U.S. Champion Two Year Old Colt

Damsire of notable horses such as:
 Bostonian (1924) - won 1927 Preakness Stakes
 Whiskery (1924) - won 1927 Kentucky Derby, Champion Three Year Old Colt
 Victorian (1925) - won 1928 Preakness Stakes
 Top Flight (1929) - U.S. Racing Hall of Fame inductee, 1931 U.S. Champion Two Year Old Filly & 1932 Champion Three Year Old Filly

Grandsire of notable horses such as:
 Black Gold (1921) - Hall of Fame inductee, 1924 Kentucky Derby winner
 Equipose (1928-1938) - National Museum of Racing and Hall of Fame inductee, Two Time Horse of the Year (1932,1933)
 Brokers Tip (1930) - 1933 Kentucky Derby winner
 Bimelech (1937) - Hall of Fame inductee, 1940 Preakness and Belmont Stakes winner

Pedigree

See also
 List of historical horses

References
 Peter Pan's pedigree and partial racing stats

1904 racehorse births
1933 racehorse deaths
Racehorses bred in Kentucky
Racehorses trained in the United States
American Champion racehorses
Belmont Stakes winners
United States Thoroughbred Racing Hall of Fame inductees
United States Champion Thoroughbred Sires
Thoroughbred family 2-o
Chefs-de-Race